Shopping is a 1994 British action crime drama film written and directed by Paul W. S. Anderson about a group of British teenagers who indulge in joyriding and ramraiding. It was the first major leading role for actor Jude Law, who first met his co-star and future wife Sadie Frost on the set of the film.

The film was located at Trellick Tower, Golborne Road, London.

Cast

Sadie Frost – Jo
Jude Law – Billy
Sean Pertwee – Tommy
Fraser James – Be Bop
Sean Bean – Venning
Marianne Faithfull – Bev
Jonathan Pryce – Conway
Daniel Newman – Monkey (as Danny Newman)
Lee Whitlock – Pony
Ralph Ineson – Dix
Eamonn Walker – Peters
Jason Isaacs – Market Trader
Chris Constantinou – Yuppie
Tilly Vosburgh – Mrs. Taylor
Melanie Hill – Sarah

Soundtrack

The Sabres of Paradise – Theme
Smith & Mighty  – Drowning Man
The Disposable Heroes of Hiphoprisy – Water Pistol Man
Senser – No Comply
Stereo MC's – Wake Up
Barrington Pheloung – Hunters and Hunted
James Vs The Sabres of Paradise – Honest Joe (Spaghetti Steamhammer Mix)
Credit to the Nation – Call It What You Want
Kaliphz – Vibe Da Joint
Utah Saints – I still think of you
Wool – The Witch
Perfecto – Rise
One Dove – Why don't you take me
Barrington Pheloung – Billys Theme
Shakespears Sister – Waiting
Barrington Pheloung – Climb Down To Crash
Orbital – Crash and Carry (a.k.a. The Meet)
Salt-n-Pepa – Heaven or Hell
EMF – Don't Look Back
Barrington Pheloung – Tread The Thin Line
Utah Saints – Highlander (not on soundtrack album)

Reviews
Channel 4 wrote a mixed review of Shopping, stating that "borrowing from Blade Runner and Gotham City to build his vision of a country divided. While a lack of subtlety clouds his intentions, the director delivers a slick, diverting story that will probably be best remembered as Jude Law's first movie."

See also
Joyriding
Ramraiding

References

External links 
 
 
 
 

1994 films
1990s action drama films
1994 action thriller films
1994 crime drama films
1994 crime thriller films
1990s teen drama films
1990s crime action films
1990s thriller drama films
British action thriller films
British crime drama films
British crime thriller films
British teen drama films
British thriller drama films
1990s English-language films
Film4 Productions films
Films directed by Paul W. S. Anderson
Films set in London
Films shot in London
1994 directorial debut films
1990s British films